Amor a la Catalán (English: Catalán's Love) is a Chilean telenovela produced by AGTV Producciones and broadcast by Canal 13 since July 6, 2019.

Cast

Main cast 
 Daniela Ramírez as Dafne María Catalán Cabezas
 Matías Assler as Rafael Andrés Catalán Cruzat
 Tamara Acosta as Yanara Carla "Yani" Cabezas Rojas
 Catalina Guerra as Isabel Paz Cruzat Swett
 Cristián Campos as Fernando Manuel Catalán López
 Fernando Kliche as Pedro José Catalán López
 Josefina Montané as Lucía del Pilar Fernández Zabala

Supporting cast 
 Loreto Aravena as Danae del Carmen Catalán Cabezas
Álvaro Espinoza as Primitivo Mardones Contreras
Ximena Rivas as Betsy Ruth Mardones Contreras
Renato Munster as Walter Ruiz
Alessandra Guerzoni as Ana María Ibáñez
José Soza as Basilio Mardones Saavedra
Josefina Velasco as Marta Pacheco
Gabriel Urzúa as Camilo Gonzalo Pacheco Millán
 as Lucas Vidal
Nathalia Aragonese as Charito Mamani
Francisco Dañobeitía as Diego Catalán Cruzat
 Javiera Mendoza as Tatiana Mardones Mardones
 Lucas Mosquera as Alexander Bedoya
 Erlande Augustin as Sabine Veret
 Carol Matos as Sandra Milena
 Francelis López as Dulce

References

External links 
  

2019 Chilean television series debuts
2019 telenovelas
Chilean telenovelas
Canal 13 (Chilean TV channel) telenovelas
Spanish-language telenovelas
Television shows set in Santiago
Comedy telenovelas